Anand Ranga is a film director who works in Telugu film Industry.

Personal life and career
Anand Ranga was born and raised in Hyderabad. He graduated in computers and then went on to do Diploma in Film Technology, specializing in direction and screenplay writing from Film & Television Institute of Tamil Nadu, Chennai. He directed his debut Telugu feature film Oy! in 2009. He started a production house called Random Thoughts has produced two films DK Bose (2015) & Poga (2014).

Ranga is married to Telugu film dubbing artist Sowmya Sharma and lives in Hyderabad.

Filmography

Director 

 Shootout at Alair (2020)
 Oy! (Telugu) (2009)

Additional screenplay and executive producer 

 Kaadhali (2017)

References 

1975 births
Living people
Telugu film directors
Film directors from Hyderabad, India